Renate Rungger (born 6 September 1979) is a former Italian female long-distance runner, mountain runner and sky runner who competed at individual senior level at the IAAF World Half Marathon Championships.

Biography
She won several medals at the World and European championships in the mountain running, one of these at individual level.

Achievements

National titles
She won three national championships at individual senior level.
Italian Athletics Championships
10,000 m: 2005
Italian Cross Country Championships
Long race: 2007
Italian Vertical Kilometer Championships
Vertical Kilometer: 2012

References

External links
 

1979 births
Living people
Italian female long-distance runners
Italian female mountain runners
Italian sky runners
People from Sarntal
Athletics competitors of Gruppo Sportivo Forestale
Sportspeople from Südtirol